Actias callandra, the Andaman moon moth, is a moth in the family Saturniidae. It is found in India (the Andaman Islands).

The larvae have been reared on Lannea coromandelica and possibly also feed on Rhizophora species.

References

Callandra
Moths described in 1911
Moths of Asia